Begin Yoshioka (吉岡 ビギン, born 12 June 2000) is a Japanese kickboxer, currently signed with K-1. He is the former Krush Bantamweight champion.

He was ranked the #10 flyweight according to Combat Press between September 2020 and October 2020.

Kickboxing career

Early career
He suffered the only loss of his early professional career to Naoki Yamada, during Hoost Cup Kings Kyoto 4, losing the bout by majority decision.

He fought three months later at Hoost Cup Kings Nagoya 4, being scheduled to face Kaito Komaki. The fight was ruled a majority draw.

Yoshioka was scheduled to fight Koki during Krush 112. He won the fight by a unanimous decision.

Krush

Krush Bantamweight title reign
He was scheduled to fight Koji Ikeda, in the first round of the Krush Bantamweight tournament, at Krush 118 on October 17, 2020. He won the fight by a split decision. Advancing to the semifinals, Yoshioka was scheduled to fight Toma Kuroda. He defeated Kuroda by unanimous decision, and faced Mao Hashimoto in the final bout of the tournament. The fight went into an extra round, after which Yoshioka won a split decision.

He was scheduled to make his first title defense against Miburo Kazuki, at Krush 123 on March 27, 2021. As Yohioka came into the fight 1.3kg over the weight limit, he was deducted two points at the start of the bout and fought with heavier gloves. He lost by majority decision.

Krush Super Bantamweight tournament
Yoshioka took part in the Krush Super Bantamweight tournament, held to crown a new champion. He was scheduled to face Riamu at Krush 128, on August 21, 2021, in the tournament quarterfinals. Yoshioka had trouble making weight for the bout, as he came in 1.3kg over the super bantamweight limit on his first weigh-in. He was unable to make weight for the second weight in as well, coming in .5kg over the limit. As a result, Yoshioka was forced to fight with 10 oz gloves instead of the 8 oz gloves, was given an automatic 1 point deduction at the beginning of the fight, and was deducted 20% from his fight purse. Yoshioka lost the fight by unanimous decision.

Continued Super Bantamweight career
Yoshioka was booked to face Lyra Nagasaki at Krush 137 on May 21, 2022. He lost the fight by a second-round knockout.

Yoshioka faced the one-time KNOCK OUT RED Super Flyweight champion Yusei Shirahata at Krush.146 on February 25, 2023. He lost the fight by majority decision.

Championships and accomplishments
Professional
 2020 Krush Bantamweight (-53kg) Champion

Amateur
 2011 King of Strikers Jr -35kg Champion
 2013 Kyoken Jr Kickboxing welterweight Champion

Fight record

|-  style="text-align:center; background:#fbb;"
| 2023-02-25 || Loss|| align=left| Yusei Shirahata ||  Krush.146  || Tokyo, Japan || Decision (Majority)|| 3 || 3:00  
|-  style="text-align:center; background:#fbb;"
| 2022-05-21|| Loss ||align=left| Lyra Nagasaki|| Krush 137 || Tokyo, Japan || KO (Right straight) || 2 || 1:46
|-  style="background:#fbb;"
| 2021-08-21 || Loss || align=left| Riamu || Krush 128, -55kg Championship Tournament Quarter Finals || Tokyo, Japan || Decision (Unanimous) || 3 || 3:00
|-
! style=background:white colspan=9 |
|-  style="background:#fbb;"
| 2021-03-27 || Loss || align=left| Kazuki Miburo || Krush 123 || Tokyo, Japan || Decision (Majority)  || 3 || 3:00
|-
! style=background:white colspan=9 |
|-  style="background:#cfc;"
| 2020-12-19 || Win || align=left| Mao Hashimoto || Krush 120, -53kg Championship Tournament Final || Tokyo, Japan || Ext.R Decision (Split) || 4 || 3:00
|-
! style=background:white colspan=9 |
|-  style="background:#cfc;"
| 2020-12-19 || Win || align=left| Toma Kuroda || Krush 120, -53kg Championship Tournament Semi Finals || Tokyo, Japan || Decision (Unanimous) ||3  ||3:00
|-  style="background:#cfc;"
| 2020-10-17 || Win || align=left| Koji Ikeda || Krush 118, -53kg Championship Tournament Quarter Finals || Tokyo, Japan || Decision (Split) || 3 ||3:00
|-  style="background:#cfc;"
| 2020-03-28 || Win || align=left| Koki || Krush 112 || Tokyo, Japan || Decision (Unanimous) || 3 || 3:00
|-  style="background:#cfc;"
| 2019-11-16 || Win || align=left| Aoshi || Krush 108 || Osaka, Japan || Ext.R Decision (Split) || 4 || 3:00
|-  style="background:#c5d2ea;"
| 2018-05-20 || Draw || align=left| Kaito Komaki || Hoost Cup Kings Nagoya 4 || Nagoya, Japan || Decision (Majority) || 3 || 3:00
|-  style="background:#fbb;"
| 2018-02-25 || Loss || align=left| Naoki Yamada || Hoost Cup Kings Kyoto 4 || Kyoto, Japan || Decision (Majority) || 3 || 3:00
|-  style="background:#CCFFCC;"
| 2017-12-10|| Win ||align=left| Kiyoyuki || RKS PROFESSIONAL FIGHTING GOLD RUSH || Osaka, Japan || TKO ||3 || 0:40
|-  style="background:#CCFFCC;"
| 2014-07-20|| Win ||align=left| Yuya Ohara|| GO-1 spirits BODYMAKER || Osaka, Japan || Decision (Majority) ||3 || 3:00
|-
| colspan=9 | Legend:    

|-  style="background:#FFBBBB;"
| 2014-03-30|| Loss || align=left| Kazuya Oohara || MA Japan Kickboxing RKS|| Osaka, Japan || Decision (Unanimous)|| 2 ||2:00
|-
! style=background:white colspan=9 |
|-  style="background:#CCFFCC;"
| 2013-07-07|| Win || align=left| Riku Kitani || Kyoken Jr. Kick 9|| Osaka, Japan || Decision (Unanimous)|| 2 ||2:00
|-  style="background:#c5d2ea;"
| 2013-05-26|| Draw || align=left| Kazane Nagai || GLADIATOR 56|| Osaka, Japan || Decision || 2 ||2:00
|-  style="background:#CCFFCC;"
| 2013-03-31|| Win || align=left| Shoki Kaneda || Chakuriki Gold Rush in RKS|| Osaka, Japan || Decision (Split)|| 2 ||2:00
|-  style="background:#FFBBBB;"
| 2013-03-17|| Loss || align=left| Riku Kitani || Kyoken Jr. Kick 7|| Osaka, Japan || Decision (Majority)|| 2 ||2:00
|-
! style=background:white colspan=9 |
|-  style="background:#CCFFCC;"
| 2013-01-20||Win || align=left| Riku Kitani || Kyoken Jr. Kick 6, Final|| Osaka, Japan || Decision (Unanimous)|| 2 ||2:00
|-
! style=background:white colspan=9 |
|-  style="background:#CCFFCC;"
| 2013-01-20||Win || align=left| Yuuji Hayashi || Kyoken Jr. Kick 6, Semi Final|| Osaka, Japan || Decision || 2 ||2:00
|-  style="background:#CCFFCC;"
| 2013-01-20||Win || align=left| Kosuke Utsumi|| Kyoken Jr. Kick.6, Quarter Final|| Osaka, Japan || Decision || 2 ||2:00
|-  style="background:#FFBBBB;"
| 2012-11-18||Loss || align=left| Riku Kitani|| Kyoken Jr. Kick,  Final|| Osaka, Japan || Ext.R Decision (Unanimous) || 3 ||2:00
|-
! style=background:white colspan=9 |
|-  style="background:#CCFFCC;"
| 2012-11-18||Win || align=left| Katsuya Aoki || Kyoken Jr. Kick, Semi Final|| Osaka, Japan || Decision || 2 ||2:00
|-  style="background:#CCFFCC;"
| 2012-11-18||Win || align=left| Rika Nakagawa || Kyoken Jr. Kick, Quarter Final|| Osaka, Japan || Decision || 2 ||2:00
|-  style="background:#CCFFCC;"
| 2012-11-18||Win || align=left| Takeshi Ikeda|| Kyoken Jr. Kick, First Round|| Osaka, Japan || Decision || 2 ||2:00
|-  style="background:#FFBBBB;"
| 2012-09-02||Loss || align=left| Riku Kitani|| Kyoken Jr. Kick, Final|| Osaka, Japan || Ext.R Decision (Split) ||  ||
|-  style="background:#CCFFCC;"
| 2012-09-02||Win || align=left| Keita Fujishiro|| Kyoken Jr. Kick, Semi Final|| Osaka, Japan || Decision || 2 ||2:00
|-  style="background:#CCFFCC;"
| 2012-07-15||Win || align=left| Rika Nakagawa|| Kyoken Jr. Kick 3|| Osaka, Japan || Decision (Majority) || 2 ||2:00
|-  style="background:#CCFFCC;"
| 2012-07-15||Win || align=left| Ryuya Tsugawa|| Kyoken Jr. Kick 3|| Osaka, Japan || Decision (Unanimous) || 2 ||2:00
|-  style="background:#fbb;"
| 2012-07-01|| Loss ||align=left| Kazuki Yamada || Muay Thai WINDY Super Fight in NAGOYA～MuayThaiphoon!～ || Aichi Prefecture, Japan || Decision ||  ||
|-  style="background:#c5d2ea;"
| 2012-05-26||Draw || align=left| Harumi Nagai|| GLADIATOR 56|| Osaka, Japan || Decision || 2 ||2:00
|-  style="background:#CCFFCC;"
| 2012-03-11||Win || align=left| Koki Fukuoka|| Kyoken Jr. Kick 1|| Osaka, Japan || Decision (Unanimous) || 2 ||2:00
|-  style="background:#FFBBBB;"
| 2012-01-29||Loss || align=left| Hiroki Koga|| King of Strikers 7|| Osaka, Japan || Decision || 3 ||2:00
|-
! style=background:white colspan=9 |
|-  style="background:#CCFFCC;"
| 2011-10-10||Win || align=left| Toi Kita|| King of Strikers 7, Final|| Fukuoka Prefecture, Japan || Decision || 3 ||2:00
|-
! style=background:white colspan=9 |
|-  style="background:#CCFFCC;"
| 2011-10-10||Win || align=left| Shinsuke Matsumoto|| King of Strikers 7, Semi Final|| Fukuoka Prefecture, Japan || Decision || 1 ||2:00
|-  style="background:#FFBBBB;"
| 2011-07-03||Loss || align=left| Tatsuya Sakakibara|| Muay Thai WINDY Super Fight in NAGOYA ～Muay Tyhoon!～|| Nagoya, Japan || Decision || 2 ||2:00
|-  style="background:#FFBBBB;"
| 2011-05-04||Loss || align=left| Hayato Nakanishi|| Kakutougi MISSION 21|| Osaka, Japan || Decision (Unanimous) || 2 ||1:30
|-  style="background:#CCFFCC;"
| 2011-05-04||Win|| align=left| Ryusei Shimizu|| Kakutougi MISSION 21|| Osaka, Japan || Ext.R Decision (Unanimous) || 3 ||1:30
|-  style="background:#CCFFCC;"
| 2010-10-10||Win|| align=left| Ohtani|| NEXT LEVEL NJKF 3|| Okayama Prefecture, Japan || Decision (Unanimous) || 2 ||1:30
|-  style="background:#c5d2ea;"
| 2010-08-08||Draw || align=left| Yuto Kuroda|| DEEP☆KICK 4|| Osaka, Japan || Decision || 2 ||2:00
|-  style="background:#CCFFCC;"
| 2010-04-25||Win|| align=left| Ryouto Maruo|| NEXT LEVEL NJKF 1|| Okayama Prefecture, Japan || KO || 2 ||
|-  style="background:#CCFFCC;"
| 2010-04-25||Win|| align=left| Takumi Sakamoto|| NEXT LEVEL NJKF 1|| Okayama Prefecture, Japan || Ext.R Decision (Majority) ||3 || 2:00
|-
| colspan=9 | Legend:

See also
 List of male kickboxers

References 

2000 births
Living people
Flyweight kickboxers
Japanese male kickboxers
People from Himeji, Hyōgo
Sportspeople from Hyōgo Prefecture